Kondopoga is a town in the Republic of Karelia, Russia

Kondopoga may also refer to:
OAO Kondopoga, a cellulose and paper production company in the Republic of Karelia, Russia
Kondopoga Hydroelectric Station, a power station in Russia
FC Kondopoga, a soccer team in the Russian Amateur Football League
Soviet landing ship Kondopoga, a ship of the Russian Navy
Kondopoga Bay, Russia